Harry Van Barneveld (born 18 February 1967) is a former Belgian judoka. At the 1996 Summer Olympics in Atlanta he won the bronze medal in the heavyweight category. Van Barneveld considers his victory in the 1992 Kano Cup his greatest victory, as this was a first for a non-Japanese judoka.

References

External links
 

1967 births
Living people
Belgian male judoka
Judoka at the 1992 Summer Olympics
Judoka at the 1996 Summer Olympics
Judoka at the 2000 Summer Olympics
Olympic judoka of Belgium
Olympic medalists in judo
Medalists at the 1996 Summer Olympics
Olympic bronze medalists for Belgium
Goodwill Games medalists in judo
Competitors at the 1994 Goodwill Games